The Pirate Movie is a 1982 Australian musical romantic comedy film directed by Ken Annakin, and starring Christopher Atkins and Kristy McNichol. Loosely based on Gilbert and Sullivan's 1879 comic opera The Pirates of Penzance, the original music score is composed by Mike Brady and Peter Sullivan (no relation to Pirates of Penzance composer Arthur Sullivan).

The film performed far below expectations in initial release and is generally reviewed very poorly, but fared far more positively with audiences. It has developed a cult following following home media release and TV airings.

Plot
Mabel Stanley is an introverted and bookish teenage girl from the United States in a seaside community in Australia as an exchange student. She attends a local pirate festival featuring a swordplay demonstration led by a young curly-haired instructor and fellow American, who then invites her for a ride on his boat. She is duped by her exchange family sisters, Edith, Kate and Isabel, into missing the launch, so she rents a small sailboat to give chase. A sudden storm throws her overboard, and she washes up on a beach.

She subsequently dreams an adventure that takes place a century before. In this fantasy sequence, the swordplay instructor is now named Frederic, a young apprentice of the Pirates of Penzance, celebrating his 21st birthday on a pirate vessel. Frederic refuses an invitation from the Pirate King, his adoptive father, to become a full pirate, as his birth parents were murdered by their contemporaries. Frederic swears to avenge their deaths and is forced off of the ship on a small boat.

Adrift, Frederic spies Mabel and her older sisters on a nearby island and swims to shore to greet them. In a reversal of roles, Mabel is a confident, assertive, and courageous young woman, while her sisters are prim, proper and conservative. Frederic quickly falls for Mabel and proposes marriage, but local custom requires the elder sisters to marry first.

Soon, Frederic's old mates come ashore, also looking for women and kidnap Mabel's sisters. Major-General Stanley, Mabel's father, arrives and convinces the Pirate King to free his daughters and leave in peace. The pirates anchor their ship just outside the harbour instead of actually leaving. Mabel wants Frederic to gain favour with her father so they can marry, so she plots to recover the family treasure stolen years earlier by the pirates. Unfortunately, the treasure was lost at sea, but the location where it lies was tattooed as a map on the Pirate King's back. Mabel successfully tricks the Pirate King into revealing his tattoo while Frederic sketches a copy. After Mabel manages to escape from him, she and Frederic, who has sabotaged the pirate's ship, leap overboard and swim for safety. The pirates open fire on them, but the ship partially sinks, enabling them to escape.

The next day, Mabel and Frederic recover the stolen treasure and present it to her father. The Major-General is underwhelmed as he believes the treasure will simply be stolen again once the pirates realise it is missing. Mabel dispatches Frederic to raise an army for protection, but the Pirate King interferes. The ship nurse, Ruth, convinces them to stop fighting, reminding the Pirate King of Frederic's apprenticeship contract. Frederic's birthday is 29 February, and he is dismayed to see that the contract specifies his twenty-first birthday, rather than his twenty-first year. As his birthday occurs every four years, Frederic has celebrated only five birthdays and is still bound by contract to remain with the pirates.

That night, the pirates raid the Stanley estate, and the Pirate King orders their execution. Mabel demands a "happy ending" – admitting for the first time that she believes this all to be a dream. Everyone – even the pirates – cheers their approval, leaving the Pirate King disappointed and shocked. Mabel then confronts her father, but the Major-General is steadfast that the marriage custom remains in effect. Mabel quickly pairs each of her older sisters with a pirate, and she also pairs the Pirate King to Ruth. With Mabel and Frederic now free to marry, the fantasy sequence ends in song and dance.

Mabel awakens back on the beach to discover that she is wearing the wedding ring that Frederic had given her in her dream. At that moment, the handsome swordplay instructor arrives and lifts her to her feet. He passionately kisses Mabel, who is still shaken by her dream. She asks if his name is Frederic. He assures her that he isn't who she imagines him to be, but then carries her off to marry her, thus giving Mabel her happy ending in reality as well.

Cast
 Christopher Atkins as Swordplay Instructor/Frederic
 Kristy McNichol as Mabel Stanley
 Ted Hamilton as The Pirate King
 Bill Kerr as Major-General Stanley
 Maggie Kirkpatrick as Ruth, the ship nurse
 Garry McDonald as Sergeant/Inspector
 Chuck McKinney as Samuel
 Kate Ferguson as Edith
 Rhonda Burchmore as Kate
 Catherine Lynch as Isabel

Production

Development
The film was the idea of actor Ted Hamilton, who became executive producer. Richard Franklin was first announced as director, but then Ken Annakin got the job, and was rushed into production when Joseph Papp announced that he was going to produce a film version of his Broadway production of The Pirates of Penzance.

Filming
Principal photography was shot at the Polly Woodside at the South Melbourne wharf, the Farm and Mansion at Werribee Park, and the Loch Ard on the Great Ocean Road, Port Campbell, from November 1981 to January 1982.

Secondary locations included various parts of Sydney, namely McDonald's Cremorne (in the beginning sequences, after Fred invites Mabel and her friends on the boat), Rushcutters Bay Marina (where Mabel obtains a small sailboat), and Palm Beach for some of the beach scenes.

Music
The musical numbers, primarily inspired by Gilbert & Sullivan, were written by Terry Britten, Kit Hain, Sue Shifrin and Brian Robertson.

 "Victory" – The Pirates
 "I Am a Pirate King" – The Pirates
 "The Sisters' Song" – The Sisters
 "First Love" – Frederic and Mabel
 "The Modern Major General's Song" – Major General Stanley and Cast
 "Pumpin' and Blowin'" – Mabel
 "How Can I Live Without Her?" – Frederic
 "Hold On" – Mabel
 "Tarantara" – The Policemen
 "We Are the Pirates" – The Pirates
 "Come Friends, Who Plough the Sea" – The Pirates
 "Happy Ending" – Cast

Soundtrack

The Pirate Movie soundtrack album was released by Polydor Records in August 1982 on vinyl and cassette. The album reached number 166 on the American Billboard 200, while the single "How Can I Live Without Her" peaked at number 71 on the Billboard Hot 100.

 A1 – "Victory" – The Pirates (2:37)
 A2 – "First Love" – Kristy McNichol and Christopher Atkins (4:13)
 A3 – "How Can I Live Without Her" – Christopher Atkins (3:08)
 A4 – "Hold On" – Kristy McNichol (3:14)
 A5 – "We Are the Pirates" – Ian Mason (3:36)
 B1 – "Pumpin' and Blowin'" – Kristy McNichol (3:05)
 B2 – "Stand Up and Sing" – Kool & the Gang (4:32) (from Something Special)
 B3 – "Happy Ending" – The Peter Cupples Band (4:58)
 B4 – "The Chase" – Peter Sullivan and The Orchestra (1:33)
 B5 – "I Am a Pirate King" – Ted Hamilton and The Pirates (2:03)
 C1 – "Happy Ending" – The Cast of The Pirate Movie (4:18)
 C2 – "The Chinese Battle" – Peter Sullivan and The Orchestra (2:36)
 C3 – "The Modern Major General's Song" – Bill Kerr and The Cast of The Pirate Movie (2:00)
 C4 – "We Are the Pirates" – The Pirates (2:18)
 C5 – "Medley" – Peter Sullivan and The Orchestra (4:03)
 D1 – "Tarantara" – Gary McDonald and The Policemen (1:53)
 D2 – "The Duel" – Peter Sullivan and The Orchestra (4:04)
 D3 – "The Sisters' Song" – The Sisters (2:42)
 D4 – "Pirates, Police and Pizza" – Peter Sullivan and The Orchestra (3:32)
 D5 – "Come Friends Who Plough the Sea" – Ted Hamilton and The Pirates (2:00)

Charts

Release
The Pirate Movie was made soon after the 1980 New York City Central Park and 1981 Broadway theatre production of The Pirates of Penzance produced by Joseph Papp, which re-popularized swashbuckling pirates as a theatrical genre.

Box office
The film earned A$1,013,000 at the Australian box office. In the United States, the film grossed $7,983,086.

Critical reception
On Rotten Tomatoes, the film has an approval rating of 9% based on 11 reviews, with an average rating of 2.23/10. On Metacritic, it has a weighted average score of 19 out of 100, based on reviews from 6 critics, indicating "Overwhelming dislike".

The Irish Times review called The Pirate Movie a "travesty" of the Gilbert and Sullivan original and said "with a philosophy of shove everything in regardless, it's nothing more than a waste of Miss McNichol's abilities, the audience's time and the incentives offered to make films in Australia." Leonard Maltin's Movie Guide rated the film as a BOMB and stated: "Not only trashes the original, but also fails on its own paltry terms. It should have been called The Rip-off Movie". TV Guide stated "Pop tunes are mixed in with some of the original G&S songs in a pirate period setting that grates on the nerves, as does the inane toilet humor that substitutes for wit. All the performers, especially McNichol, look as if they can't wait until the film is over, and one can hardly blame them."
Michael and Harry Medved's book Son of Golden Turkey Awards includes The Pirate Movie's "First Love" on its list of "Worst Rock 'N Roll Lyrics in a Movie".

Australian film critic Michael Adams later included The Pirate Movie on his list of the worst ever Australian films, along with Phantom Gold, The Glenrowan Affair, Houseboat Horror, Welcome to Woop Woop, Les Patterson Saves the World and Pandemonium.

Accolades

The film is listed in Golden Raspberry Award founder John Wilson's book The Official Razzie Movie Guide as one of The 100 Most Enjoyably Bad Movies Ever Made.

References

External links

 
 
 
 The Pirate Movie at Oz Movies
 

1982 films
1982 comedy films
1980s adventure films
1980s musical comedy films
Australian musical comedy films
Films directed by Ken Annakin
Films based on works by Gilbert and Sullivan
Films set in Australia
Films shot in Melbourne
Australian musical fantasy films
Pirate films
Rock musicals
Romantic musical films
Films set in the 1880s
Golden Raspberry Award winning films
1980s English-language films